Gustave Fraipont (1849, Brussels – 1923, Paris) was a painter, sculptor, illustrator and poster-designer. Born in Belgium, he later became a naturalised French citizen.

Professor of drawing at the Maison d'éducation de la Légion d'honneur, he was the author of numerous books on the art of drawing. In 1885, he provided illustrations for the series Le Littoral de la France at the publisher . He also illustrated books on Paris and the French regions. He produced books for young people such as 'André le meunier' (Andre the Miller') and 'et Yves le marin (Sailor Yves). He also illustrated the Letters from My Windmill, Perrault's Histoires ou contes du temps passé, Robinson Crusoe', Câline by Zenaide Fleuriot.

He painted numerous posters for railway companies, including Chemins de fer de l'Ouest and Compagnie des chemins de fer du Nord, as well as official documents and paper securities. His poster Pierrefonds, North company was reproduced in the magazine Les Maîtres de l'Affiche (1895–1900). He contributed to many newspapers and magazines, such as French and Paris Courier. In 1905, he was appointed Navy painter.

During World War I, he produced several compositions for the newspaper L'Illustration'', including the monuments destroyed by war: Ypres Cloth Hall, Reims Cathedral and Arras Town Hall.

Gallery

External links
 http://livresanciens-tarascon.blogspot.com/2012/03/gustave-et-georges-fraipont.html

1849 births
1923 deaths
French people of Belgian descent
Artists from Brussels
19th-century French painters
French male painters
20th-century French painters
20th-century French male artists
French designers
Belgian painters
Belgian sculptors
Belgian designers
20th-century French sculptors
19th-century French sculptors
French male sculptors
19th-century French male artists